Oakleaf High School is a high school located in Orange Park, Florida.

History
The school began construction in 2007 and was completed in June 2010. The school's grand opening was August 16, 2010. The class of 2012 was the first class to graduate from Oakleaf High School. Since its opening, Oakleaf has gained a reputation for inclusiveness, being home to several multicultural organizations such as the Hispanic Club, Filipino Club, and Christian Club, as well as ranking within the top twenty schools in Florida for diversity of the student body.

Athletics

Oakleaf's athletics include baseball, basketball, cheerleading, cross country, a dance team, football, golf, softball, swimming, volleyball, weightlifting, wrestling, tennis, marching band and soccer. The teams are called the Knights.

Aviation/Aerospace Academy

Oakleaf High School is the only school in Clay County with the Aviation/Aerospace Academy. The academy brought several classes to the school to instruct the students in aviation. The academy has been a part of Oakleaf High School's course selection since its inaugural year. 
The school also has a health science program for students that want to work in the health field. Students can become Certified Nurse Assistants (CNAs) once they complete the requisite courses.

Notable alumni
 Shaquille Quarterman, NFL linebacker
 Nassir Little, NBA (Attended freshman & sophomore year)
 Chris Westry, NFL cornerback

References

External links
Official Website

High schools in Clay County, Florida
Public high schools in Florida
Educational institutions established in 2010
Westside, Jacksonville
2010 establishments in Florida